Rue Saint-Malo is a paved street in Brest, France.  It is located in the Carpon valley, against the plateau des Capucins in the Recouvrance quarter.  Only its lower half survives, as the oldest street in the city.

It runs along the wall of the terrain de la Madeleine, where once stood the convent which took in 'sinful women' and (after the revocation of the edict of Nantes) Huguenots.  It is lined with 17th- and 18th-century houses and overlooked by terraced gardens.  After its fountain, the road runs into the levée de Pontaniou and ends in the staircase of the Madeleine which leads to the plateau des Capucins.

History

See also 

 Rue de Siam
 Arsenal de Brest

External links 
  Official site for the association Vivre la rue created in 1989 for the preservation of rue Saint-Malo

Geography of Brest, France
History of Brest, France
Streets in Brest, France